Messehalle is a convention center and sports venue located in Innsbruck, Austria. The venue hosted some of the ice hockey games for both the 1964 and 1976 Winter Olympics.

References
1964 Winter Olympics official report. pp. 66–7. 
1976 Winter Olympics official report. pp. 206–8. 
Official website. 

Venues of the 1964 Winter Olympics
Venues of the 1976 Winter Olympics
Olympic ice hockey venues
Sports venues in Tyrol (state)
Buildings and structures in Innsbruck